The fifteenth season of the American animated television series The Simpsons aired from Sunday, November 2, 2003, to Sunday, May 23, 2004. The season contains five hold-over episodes from the season 14 (EABF) production line. The most watched episode had 16.2 million viewers and the least watched had 6.2 million viewers. Season 15 was released on DVD and Blu-ray in Region 1 on December 4, 2012, Region 2 on December 3, 2012, and Region 4 on December 12, 2012.

Response

Critical reception
Season 15 received positive reviews, though many reviewers commented that while the episodes were generally enjoyable, they were of a lesser quality than those of the series' first decade. The general consensus is that this marked an improvement over the early teen seasons.

High Def Digest gave a rating of 4 stars, writing "The Simpsons' is one of only a handful of shows that I know I'm guaranteed to laugh out loud at least once an episode (usually more). Even though the cutting wit of the first decade lost its edge a bit, I still find 'The Simpsons' an extremely enjoyable way to spend my time. There aren't many things that are better than sitting down with a new season of 'The Simpsons' on Blu-ray and watching every episode back to back as fast as I possibly can. While the episodes sort of blend together, the humor is still there, and I still end up having quite a few genuine laughs". CraveOnline rated the season 8.5/10, noting "Some "Simpsons" fans gave up during a perceived rough patch around season 12, and boy have they missed out. Season 13 was a particular favorite of mine, but now we're over the hump on the DVD releases. Season 15 is kind of a sweet spot, because it's got some highlight episodes I love, but also plenty that I don't remember." DVDActive said "The Simpsons season 15 isn't one of the series' best, but I'm pretty sure it isn't one of the worst either". ScreenJabber gave a rating of 4 stars, writing "Imagine my surprise when I sat down to review Season 15...and realised that I had never seen most of its episodes. Imagine, then, my joy at being able to enjoy almost 22 episodes of factory-fresh Simpsons, even though they were made about a decade ago. And even though some of the cultural references are a little dated, there's still an awful lot to laugh at and enjoy here. As always, this season of The Simpsons features a stellar line-up of guest stars. And, as always, there are some standout episodes. All in all, a more than decent season of this long, long-running show." DIY wrote "While Season 15 of The Simpsons may not be golden from start to finish it has a higher great to soggy episode ratio than more recent seasons. In fact, there are some real gems amongst the 22 episodes". Boxofficebuz gave it 4 stars, and said "...Throw in flashback episode 'The Way We [Weren't],' Pie-Man antics in 'Simple Simpson' and a Catch Me If You Can spoof in 'Catch 'Em If You Can,' you have a solid, solid season. A definite uptick over the previous couple seasons". BubbleBlabber rated it 9.0 out of 10, and concluded "In terms of the content, Season 15 was a highly underrated season for The Simpsons and brought along a number of now well-known classics". DVDMg gave the season a B, and wrote "Should viewers expect greatness from Season 15 of The Simpsons? No, as the year comes with some mediocre shows. Still, it delivers a reasonable number of good episodes and seems worthwhile overall...S15 won't win over new fans, but it's usually fun".

Nielsen ratings
The season ranked 42 in the seasonal ratings below its repeat timeslot at 36. The average viewership was 10.59 million viewers.

Episodes

Blu-ray and DVD release
The DVD and Blu-ray boxset for season fifteen was released by 20th Century Fox Home Entertainment in the United States and Canada on Tuesday, December 4, 2012, eight years after it had completed broadcast on television. As well as every episode from the season, the Blu-ray and DVD releases feature bonus material including deleted scenes, animatics, and commentaries for every episode. The boxart features Otto Mann, and a special limited edition "embossed head case" package was also released.

References

Bibliography

External links
Season 15 at The Simpsons.com

Simpsons season 15
2003 American television seasons
2004 American television seasons